Coristanco is a municipality of northwestern Spain in the province of A Coruña, in the autonomous community of Galicia. It belongs to the comarca of Bergantiños.

Notable people
 Rubén Iván Martínez (born 22 June 1984), known simply as Rubén, is a Spanish professional footballer who plays for CA Osasuna as a goalkeeper.

 José Ángel Esmorís Tasende (born 4 January 1997), known simply as Angeliño, is a Spanish professional footballer who currently plays for RB Leipzig in the left back and left midfielder positions.

References

 
Municipalities in the Province of A Coruña